In mathematics, infinitary combinatorics, or combinatorial set theory, is an extension of ideas in combinatorics to infinite sets.
Some of the things studied include continuous graphs and trees, extensions of Ramsey's theorem, and Martin's axiom.
Recent developments concern combinatorics of the continuum and combinatorics on successors of singular cardinals.

Ramsey theory for infinite sets
Write κ, λ for ordinals,  m for a cardinal number and n for a natural number.  introduced the notation

as a shorthand way of saying that every partition of the set [κ]n of n-element subsets of  into m pieces has a homogeneous set of order type λ. A homogeneous set is in this case a subset of κ such that every n-element subset is in the same element of the partition. When m is 2 it is often omitted.

Assuming the axiom of choice, there are no ordinals κ with κ→(ω)ω, so n is usually taken to be finite. An extension where n is almost allowed to be infinite is
the notation

which is a shorthand way of saying that every partition of the set of finite subsets of κ into m pieces has a subset of order type λ such that for any finite n, all subsets of size n are in the same element of the partition. When m is 2 it is often omitted.

Another variation is the notation

which is a shorthand way of saying that every coloring of the set [κ]n of n-element subsets of κ with 2 colors has a subset  of order type λ such that  all elements of [λ]n have the first color, or a subset  of order type μ such that  all elements of [μ]n have the second color.

Some properties of this include: (in what follows  is a cardinal)
 for all finite n and k (Ramsey's theorem).
 (Erdős–Rado theorem.)
 (Sierpiński theorem)

 (Erdős–Dushnik–Miller theorem).

In choiceless universes, partition properties with infinite exponents may hold, and some of them are obtained as consequences of the axiom of determinacy (AD). For example, Donald A. Martin proved that AD implies

Large cardinals
Several large cardinal properties can be defined using this notation. In particular:
Weakly compact cardinals κ are those that satisfy κ→(κ)2
α-Erdős cardinals κ are the smallest that satisfy κ→(α)<ω
Ramsey cardinals κ are those that satisfy κ→(κ)<ω

Notes

References

 
 

Set theory
Combinatorics